Rêve: the Dream Ouroboros is a French fantasy tabletop role-playing game created by Denis Gerfaud and re-published in English by Malcontent Games.

Editorial history 

The first French edition was published by NEF (Nouvelles Éditions Fantastiques) in 1985. It was illustrated by Bernard Verlhac and Roger Ronsin.

The second edition was published by Multisim in 1993, and illustrated by Florence Magnin. It was reprinted by UbIK (now Edge Entertainment), the French editor for Fading Suns, in 2004.

There was also a simplified version for beginners called Oniros (1994).

At the end of 2014, Denis Gerfaud and several illustrators agreed to give a free access to the rules on the web forum Rêves d'Ailleurs.

In January 2015, the French editor Scriptarium plans to publish a new official campaign, with the agreement of Denis Gerfaud. This publication will dedicated to the memory of Bernard Verlhac aka Tignous, victim of the Charlie Hebdo shooting. The crowdfunding campaign was started on June 5, 2015 on Ulule. The success of the crowdfunding showed there was still a huge interest for this RPG, so the editor announced on June 8, 2015 that the rulebooks will be reprinted in the future.

The world of Rêve 
Note: The main author of this section is French and has therefore never read the English version of the game; there may thus be discrepancies with the terms used in the official translation

External history 
The world of Rêve is a dragons' dream. The dragons, fabulous creatures, are asleep and each of them dreams a creature; but at the same time, all of them dream the world. When a creature dies, his dragon awakes, but as the creature is also dreamt by the other dragons, its body remains.

This is a metaphor of the role-playing game itself: when players gather to play, they imagine — dream — together an adventure, and each player imagines his own character.

As well as different stories often interfere (e.g. a player plays different games in the same week), the different dreams (worlds, universe) can interfere; there are rips between them, and the character can go to a different world sometimes without noticing it! Strange creatures can also come to the present dream.

Just like a sleeper has only partial control over his dreams — why would we have nightmares otherwise? — the dragons do not completely control their creatures and worlds. The dreamed creatures have the possibility to modify the dream (the world) itself; this is the source of magic, highdreaming.

The life of a character is fuzzy between the game sessions; the player only has little ideas of what happens to his creature. In the same way, characters of Rêve de Dragon sometimes experience a gris-rêve (greydreaming): they suddenly realise that they are somewhere with companions, but only have limited memories of what happened the days before. But what happened can be the key of the current situation...

When a character dies, his dragon wakes up and then falls asleep again; at the same time, the character wakes up in a new dream, a new life. This means that the character is recreated with the same abilities, but a different past, a different job, different skills, a different name. The player thus plays the same character again — well, not exactly the same — the character is not a newborn, he is already adult, just coming from another dream.

The "sum" of all these incarnations are the archetype of the character. When the character is himself sleeping, he can remember his past incarnations, and thus learn skills he never practiced nor studied. These memories of a past life can also be the key of the adventure...

"Inner" history 
The present era is the Third Age. During the First Age, dragons liked to represent themselves in the dreams, served by creatures such as gnomes, humans, etc.

But the gnomes discovered the gems and the magic they carry. The dragons realised they did not control this world and woke up massively. This created a cataclysm in the world, which ended the First Age.

The Second Age was the age of magic. The magicians (called haut-rêvants, highdreamers) were powerful, but they manipulated amounts of dream energy far beyond their skills. Moreover, they learned to master nightmare. These excesses created rips (called "rifts") between the dreams and the dragons once again woke up massively; new cataclysm, end of the Second Age.

The Third Age is the age of travelling. The magicians left a very bad memory, so they are hated and most of them hide their skills. Due to the multiple cataclysms, many places were intermixed, so it is not unusual to find a harbour at the top of a mountain. Everybody knows that he can go to another dream just by wandering, without any chance to come back, so the travel has become a way of living for most humans. Everybody makes one day a journey; this can be just going to the next village and back, or living everyday on the road. The player characters are such journeyers.

The world has three levels:
 the basses terres du rêve (lower dreamlands) is the land the characters live in;
 the terres médianes du rêve (middle dreamlands) is a land that only highdreamers (magicians) can reach in mind, in a state of demi-rêve (half-dream); this is where they can gather the dream energy to cast spells;
 the hautes terres du rêve (higher dreamlands) is where the spirit of a character goes when he is asleep; this is where he can have the memories of his past life, and sometimes meet a reflection of the dragons themselves - an experience nobody goes through unchanged.

Mechanics of the game 

A character is mainly defined by 14 attributes which range from 6 to 15 at the creation time (the values can rise to 21 for a human), and a wide set of skills which range from -11 to +11.

The simulation system uses a resolution table: a percentage is determined from the value of an attribute, and of a skill affected by a difficulty level.

During the adventure, the character gains stress points. These stress points are converted into experience points when dreaming at night (by a dream test): the character dreams about his past incarnations, and thus can raise his attributes and skills (he remembers past skills). In particular circumstances (special result on the dream test), the character can meet a dragon during his dream; the exceptional event can bring beneficial or traumatic results.

The skills can also raise by apprenticeship.

Sources and influences 

Les Hautes Terres du rêve (literally "The Highdreamland") is a fantasy novel from Jacques Sadoul (1980).

Reviews
Casus Belli (Issue 32 - Apr 1986)
Jeux & Stratégie #36 (as "Rêve de Dragon")

See also 

 Ouroboros

References

External links 
  of Malcontent Games
 Rêve: The Dream Ouroboros on RPGnet

Fantasy role-playing games
French role-playing games
Role-playing games introduced in 1985